Wekiva High School is a high school located in Apopka, Florida, United States. The school mascot is the mustang. The school colors are maroon, navy and gold. It was established in 2007 as a relief school for Apopka High School and Ocoee High School.  Its principal is Dr. Baker Drayton.

Programs 
Wekiva High has multiple programs for students.

JROTC 
Wekiva High School's Inaugural AFJROTC cadet program competed at the 22nd Annual First Coast AFJROTC Invitational Drill Competition on January 16, 2010, at NB Forrest High School in Jacksonville, FL.

Cambridge Academy 
There is also an AICE diploma track at Wekiva.

Wekiva Culinary 
Wekiva offers a highly successful culinary program, offered to those who not only want to cook, but those who have an interest in pursuing a career in the Culinary or Hospitality Industry.

Agriscience Academy 
Wekiva offers a well-performing Agriscience program, in which students learn about knowledge in a classroom and lab setting that will prepare them for one of the many careers in the agricultural industry. The program also works in collaboration with the school's FFA chapter.

Notable people

Alumni
Tyler Davis, football player for Clemson Tigers
Logan Gilbert, baseball player for Seattle Mariners
Paul Reed, basketball player for Philadelphia 76ers

References

External links
 
Wekiva AICE Website

High schools in Orange County, Florida
Public high schools in Florida
Apopka, Florida
Orange County Public Schools
2007 establishments in Florida
Educational institutions established in 2007